Piano Sonata No. 6 may refer to: 
Piano Sonata No. 6 (Beethoven)
Piano Sonata No. 6 (Feinberg)
Piano Sonata No. 6 (Mozart)
Piano Sonata No. 6 (Prokofiev)
Piano Sonata No. 6 (Scriabin)